Metalobosia is a genus of moths in the subfamily Arctiinae. The genus was erected by George Hampson in 1900.

Species
 Metalobosia anitras Dognin, 1891
 Metalobosia atriloba Dognin, 1912
 Metalobosia chalcoela Dognin, 1912
 Metalobosia cuprea Schaus, 1896
 Metalobosia cupreata Reich, 1933
 Metalobosia diaxantha Hampson, 1914
 Metalobosia ducalis Schaus, 1911
 Metalobosia elis Druce, 1885
 Metalobosia holophaea Dognin, 1912
 Metalobosia invarda Schaus, 1905
 Metalobosia postflavida Draudt, 1918
 Metalobosia postrubida Rothschild, 1913
 Metalobosia similis Draudt, 1918
 Metalobosia varda Schaus, 1896

References

External links

Lithosiini
Moth genera